Kocuria is a genus of gram-positive bacteria. Kocuria is named after Miloslav Kocur, a Czech microbiologist. It has been found in the milk of water deer and reindeer. Cells are coccoid, resembling Staphylococcus and Micrococcus, and can group in pairs, chains, tetrads, cubical arrangements of eight, or irregular clusters. They have rigid cell walls and are either aerobic or facultative anaerobic. Kocuria can usually survive in mesophilic temperatures.

Clinical significance 
Kocuria has been found to live on human skin and oral cavity. It is generally considered non-pathogenic but can be found in some infections. Specific infection associated with Kocuria are urinary tract infections, cholecystitis, catheter-associated bacteremia, dacryocystitis, canaliculitis, keratitis, native valve endocarditis, peritonitis, descending necrotizing mediastinitis, brain abscess and meningitis. It is also occasionally isolated in the microbiome of pilonidal sinuses  Kocuria rosea is known to cause infection in immunocompromised patients, causing oropharyngeal and deep cervical infections. However, as having low pathogenicity and being very susceptible to antibiotics, with immediate surgical drainage, debridement, and administration of broad range antibiotics showed great results.

Microbiology 
Kocuria can be grown on sheep blood agar and other simple media plates. They grow best in neutral pH environments. Depending on the species, they appear in a range of color such as: orange, pink, red, yellow or cream. They are shown to lack hemolytic ability on a blood agar plate. However, they have shown to react differently to normal laboratory identification techniques. These test include: catalase, urease, oxidase, amylase, gelatins, phosphatase, beta-galactosidase activities, and carbon source and citrate utilization. Kocuria is susceptible towards bacitracin and lysozyme and resistant to nitrofurantoin, furazolidone and lysostaphin.

Environment 
In a study done by Louisiana State University, 75 strains of bacteria from the Atacama Desert were tested for its ability to grow in Mars-like climates. The environment tested contained high concentrations of perchlorate salts, a similar condition found on Mars surface. In this environment, Kocuria was found to grow in one of the highest concentrations compared to the other strains.

References

Further reading 
 Gustavo Luis de Paiva Anciens Ramos, Hilana Ceotto Vigoder, Janaína dos Santos Nascimento (2021). "Kocuria spp. in Foods: Biotechnological Uses and Risks for Food Safety" . Applied Food Biotechnology, Vol. 8 No. 2 (2021), 16 March 2021, Page 79–88. doi.org/10.22037/afb.v8i2.30748

Micrococcaceae
Bacteria genera